Hester Sigerson Piatt (13 June 1870 – 16 June 1939), was an Irish poet and republican journalist.

Life
Piatt was born Anna Hester Sigerson, known to family as Hetty, in Dublin to Hester Varian and George Sigerson. Her father was a doctor, poet and senator, her mother was also a writer as was her sister Dora Sigerson Shorter. In about 1900 Piatt married the American Vice and Deputy Consul in Ireland,  Arthur Donn Piatt. They had two children, Eibhlín Piatt Humphreys and Donn Sigerson Piatt. Her husband died in Ireland in 1914 aged 47. Piatt stayed in Ireland living in her father's house. She was a member of Cumann na mBan and covered topics like the Charles Kickham Memoir in her writings.

Piatt worked on the Weekly Freeman, taking over as "Uncle Remus" from Rose Kavanagh, a job which earned her a pound a week. She also wrote for the Lyceum, Irish Fireside and The Weekly Register as well as contributing to other American and English journals. Her poetry was published in Yeats's Irish anthology and Padraic Colum’s anthology of Irish verse.

She is buried in Glasnevin cemetery with her husband.

Bibliography
 A ruined race; or, The last MacManus of Drumroosk, 1889.
 Anne Devlin: an outline of her story, 1917.
 In a poet's garden, 1920.
 The passing years: a book of verses, 1935.
 The golden quest, and other stories, 1940.

References

Sources
 
 
 
 
 
 
 
 
 
 

1870 births
1939 deaths
19th-century Irish poets
20th-century Irish poets
Irish women poets
Irish journalists
Irish women journalists
Cumann na mBan members
20th-century Irish women writers
19th-century Irish women writers